Out All Night is a 1933 American pre-Code comedy film directed by Sam Taylor and written by William Anthony McGuire. The film stars Slim Summerville, ZaSu Pitts, Laura Hope Crews, Shirley Grey, Alexander Carr and Rollo Lloyd. The film was released April 8, 1933, by Universal Pictures.

Plot
A mama's boy falls for a spinster who works at a nursery in a department store.

Cast 
Slim Summerville as Ronald Colgate
ZaSu Pitts as Bunny
Laura Hope Crews as Mrs. Jane Colgate
Shirley Grey as Kate
Alexander Carr as Mr. Rosemountain 
Rollo Lloyd as David Arnold
Billy Barty as Child
Edward Peil Jr. as Eddie
Shirley Temple as Child 
Philip Purdy as Child
Gene Lewis as Tracy

References

External links 
 

1933 films
1930s English-language films
American comedy films
1933 comedy films
Universal Pictures films
Films directed by Sam Taylor
American black-and-white films
1930s American films